is a Sanskrit term which means "a thousand names". It is also a genre of stotra literature, usually found as a title of the text named after a deity, such as Vishnu Sahasranāma, wherein the deity is remembered by 1,000 names, attributes or epithets.

As stotras, Sahasra-namas are songs of praise, a type of devotional literature. The word is a compound of  "thousand" and   "name". A Sahasranāma often includes the names of other deities, suggesting henotheistic equivalence and/or that they may be attributes rather than personal names. Thus the Ganesha Sahasranama list of one thousand names includes Brahma, Vishnu, Shakti, Shiva, Rudra, SadaShiva and others. It also includes epithets such as Jiva (life force), Satya (truth), Param (highest), Jnana (knowledge) and others. The Vishnu Sahasranama includes in its list work and jñāna-yājna (offering of knowledge) as two attributes of Vishnu. The Lalita Sahasranama, similarly, includes the energies of a goddess that manifest in an individual as desire, wisdom and action.

A sahasranama provides a terse list of attributes, virtues and legends symbolized by a deity. There are also many shorter stotras, containing only 108 names (108 being a sacred number in Dharmic religions) and accordingly called ashtottara-shata-nāma.

Chronology
The sahasranamas such as the Vishnu Sahasranama, are not found in early Samhita manuscripts, rather found in medieval and later versions of various Samhitas. One of the significant works on Sahasranama is from the sub-school of Ramanuja and the Vishnu Sahasra-namam Bhasya (commentary) by 12th-century Parasara Bhattar.

Type

Sahasranamas are used for recitals, in ways such as:

sravana, listening to recitals of names and glories of God
nama-sankirtana, reciting the names of God either set to music or not
smarana, recalling divine deeds and teaching of divine deeds.
archana,  worshipping the divine with ritual repetition of divine names.

Hinduism
The most well-known sahasranāmas are:

Vishnu sahasranama, is a Vaishnavism stotra, and is found in section 13.135 (Anushasana Parva) of the Mahabharata, and all Puranas linked to Vaishnavism. 
Shiva sahasranama, is a Shaivism stotra, also found in 13.17 of the Mahabharata. It exists in eight different versions.  The best-known version is from Book 13 of the Mahabharata.
Lalita sahasranama, is a Shaktism stotra.
Ganesha sahasranama, is a Ganeshism stotra. One version is found in the Ganesha Purana.
Hanuman Sahasranama, is a Hanuman stotra told by Valmiki. Its origin is unknown and it is attributed to Ramachandra who is the seer for this stotra.

Tantrikas chant the Bhavani Nāma Sahasra Stuti and the Kali Sahasranāma. While the Vishnu and Shiva Sahāsranamas are popular amongst all Hindus, the Lalita Sahasranama is mostly chanted in South India. The Ganesha Sahasranama is mainly chanted by Ganapatya, the Bhavani Nāma Sahasra Stuti is the choice of s, and the Kali Sahasranāma is mostly chanted by Bengalis.

Jainism
Jina-sahasranama is a stotra text of Jainism, with thousand names of Jinasena, Ashadhara and Banarasidas, Arhannamasahasrasamuccaya by Acarya Hemacandra.

Sikhism
Guru Arjan of Sikhism, along with his associates, are credited with Sukhmani Sahasranama, composed in gauri raga, based on Hindu Puranic literature, and dedicated to Waheguru. This 17th-century Sikh text is entirely dedicated to bhakti themes.

See also
 Bhakti
 Names of God
 Bhadrakalpikasutra (thousand names of Buddha, a Buddhist text)

References

Further reading
 C. Ramanujachari. The Spiritual heritage of Thiagaraja. Ramakrishna Students Home, Mylapore, Chennai, 1957.

External links
SahasranAma stotras (160+) at sanskritdocuments.org  .
SahasranAmAvalIs (110+) at sanskritdocuments.org  .

 
Bhakti movement
Hindu philosophical concepts